Pacific Spirit Regional Park is a  park located in the University Endowment Lands, on Point Grey to the west of the city of Vancouver, British Columbia. It surrounds the endowment lands of the University of British Columbia on the shores of Georgia Strait in the Pacific Ocean. It is a nature preserve of the British Columbia government and classified under Electoral Area A.

The park contains over 73 km of walking/hiking trails, 50 km of which are designated multi-use and available for cycling and horseback riding as well.  There is a Park Centre which is located on W 16th Avenue.

In 1975, BC Parks established ninety hectares of Pacific Spirit Regional Park as the UBC Endowment Lands Ecological Reserve.  This area is designated for forest research, and is not open to the public.

The entire section of beach in Pacific Spirit (running from Acadia Beach in the north to Trail #7 in the south), including Wreck Beach, is designated as clothing optional.

There are free parking lots at Acadia, Spanish Banks and Jericho beaches, and at the information center on 16th Avenue. Pay parking can be found in a lot near Gate 7 to UBC (see map), at the UBC Museum of Anthropology, by the UBC Botanical gardens and in various visitor lots around UBC. Additionally, parking is available at different places along 16th Avenue, on SW Marine Drive from Gate 8 to the Museum of Anthropology, and along Old Marine Drive. Many of the UBC buses stop along the trails.

"Dogs must be under control at all times. There are on-leash and leash-optional areas in the park. Check local signs for details. Please show courtesy to other park visitors by removing your dog’s droppings."

There are washrooms at the head of Trail #7, Acadia Beach and at the head and base of Trail #6. "The washrooms and picnic table at the Park Centre on 16th Avenue are wheelchair-accessible. Other accessible facilities include Cleveland, Heron and Imperial Trails, as well as the Clinton Meadow picnic area. However, trails are subject to use and weathering which may degrade them to the point where their original accessible design has been compromised. It is advisable to take an able-bodied person with you."

"Pacific Spirit Park Society is actively involved in Pacific Spirit Regional Park. For more information or to get involved with this association, contact the Community Development Coordinator at the West Area Parks Office."

External links 
Pacific Spirit Regional Park Profile
Park Map
Pacific Spirit Park Society 
Pacific Spirit Walking Trail Guide

Notes

Parks in Vancouver
University Endowment Lands
1989 establishments in British Columbia